Ligang labas is a Tagalog language term for playing in a sports league (almost always basketball) other than where a player's team is primarily playing. Translated as "outside league" (or, "league that's not ours"), ligang labas are small pocket tournaments outside the televised leagues. This was also a description by former Philippine Basketball Association (PBA) players on the leagues that they've played at after leaving the PBA.

Pay at ligang labas is lucrative for ex-professionals. Players such as Val Acuña and Lester Alvarez pursued careers via ligang labas after being cut from the PBA rosters. Other players in the ligang labas include Mark Andaya, and former PBA Best Import Jamelle Cornley. Several ligang labas legends found their way in the rosters of the Maharlika Pilipinas Basketball League (MPBL).

Being caught playing in ligang labas while actually in an active roster of another team is almost always severely dealt with. Players sign exclusive contracts to play for their team, and playing elsewhere is a violation of that contract. Players have been suspended, and won games have been forfeited upon proving that a player played in a ligang labas game. Examples of suspended players are Vic Manuel and Ping Exciminiano of the Alaska Aces, Jeff Viernes of the Phoenix Fuel Masters, Ben Mbala of the De La Salle Green Archers, Eloy Poligrates of the Southwestern University Cobras, and RK Ilagan of the San Sebastian Stags. Ylagan's case even involved the National Collegiate Athletic Association docking the Stags' two wins in the 2018 tournament.

Alaska's Calvin Abueva and Gabby Espinas escaped suspension when caught in a ligang labas game in 2013.

References

Further reading

Basketball competitions in the Philippines
Tagalog words and phrases
Sports terminology